Lieutenant Colonel George Vincent Fosbery VC (11 April 1832 – 8 May 1907) was an English recipient of the Victoria Cross, the highest and most prestigious award for gallantry in the face of the enemy that can be awarded to British and Commonwealth forces. He was also a designer and inventor of firearms.

Military background
An Old Etonian, Fosbery was 31 years old, and a lieutenant in the 4th Bengal European Regiment, British Indian Army during the Umbeyla Campaign during which he was awarded the Victoria Cross. He retired from the service in 1877 having achieved the rank of lieutenant colonel.

Umbeyla Campaign

On 30 October 1863 during the Umbeyla Campaign, North-West India, Lieutenant Fosbery led a party of his regiment to recapture the Crag Picquet, after its garrison had been driven in by the enemy and 60 of them killed. The approach to the Crag was very narrow but the lieutenant led his party with great coolness, and was the first man to gain the top of the Crag from his side of the attack. Subsequently, when the commanding officer was wounded, Lieutenant Fosbery assembled a party and pursued the routed enemy, inflicting on them further losses.

Inventions
In 1895 he patented a design for a self-cocking revolver, which was taken up by the Webley & Scott Revolver & Arms Company.  The Webley-Fosbery Automatic Revolver was produced as a six-shot .455 caliber and an eight-shot .38 caliber.  

Sometime in the late 19th century he invented the Paradox gun. A gun made by Holland & Holland, so named because only the front two inches of the barrel were rifled; intended to be used as both rifle and shotgun, capable of firing both shot and conical bullets with accuracy.

Medals
In 1997, Fosbery's Victoria Cross was sold at an Alberta auction for $45,000. His medals are now on display in the Lord Ashcroft Gallery in the Imperial War Museum in London.

References

External links
Biography

Location of grave and VC medal (Avon)

British recipients of the Victoria Cross
British Indian Army officers
People from Wiltshire
1833 births
1907 deaths
English inventors
Firearm designers
British military personnel of the Umbeyla Campaign
People educated at Eton College